This is a list of Swedish artillery regiments, battalions, corps and companies that have existed in the Swedish Army. They are listed in three ways, first by the actual units that have existed, then by the various names these units have had, and last by the various designations these units have had.

By unit

New system
A 1  Svea Artillery Regiment (1914–1998)
A 2  Göta Artillery Regiment (1914–1962)
A 3  Wendes Artillery Regiment (1914–2000)
A 4  Norrland Artillery Regiment (1914–1998)
A 5  Uppland Artillery Regiment (1914–1927)
A 5  Norrbotten Artillery Corps (1928–1951)
A 6  Småland Artillery Regiment (1914–1927, 1942–1985)
A 6  Småland Army Artillery Regiment (1928–1942)
A 7  Gotland Artillery Corps (1914–1975)
A 7  Gotland Artillery Regiment (1975–2000)
A 8  Boden-Karlsborg Artillery Regiment (1914–1920)
A 8  Boden Artillery Regiment (1920–1998, 2022-)
A 8  Norrland Artillery Regiment (1998–2000)
A 9  Positionsartilleriregementet (1914–1927)
A 9  Karlsborg Artillery Regiment (1928–1937)
A 9  Karlsborg Anti-Aircraft Artillery Regiment (1937–1942)
A 9  Bergslagen Artillery Regiment (1943–2000, 2022-)
A 9  Artillery Regiment (2000-2022)
A 10 Karlsborg Artillery Corps (1920–1927)
A 10 Östgöta Anti-Aircraft Artillery Regiment (1938–1942)
A 11 Stockholm Anti-Aircraft Artillery Regiment (1939–1942)

Old system(–1914) 
 Artillery Regiment (1636–1794)
No 1 Svea Artillery Regiment (1794–1892, 1904–1914)
No 1 1st Svea Artillery Regiment (1892–1904)
No 2 Göta Artillery Regiment (1794–1892, 1904–1914)
No 2 1st Göta Artillery Regiment (1892–1904)
No 3 Wendes Artillery Regiment (1794–1914)
No 4 Finnish Artillery Regiment (1794–1811)
 Gotlands nationalbevärings artilleribeväring (1811–1861) 
No 4 Gotlands nationalbevärings artillerikår (1861–1887)
No 4 Gotland Artillery Corps (1887–1892)
No 4 Norrland Artillery Regiment (1893–1914)
No 5 Vaxholm Artillery Corps (1794–1892)
No 5 2nd Svea Artillery Regiment (1894–1904)
No 5 Uppland Artillery Regiment (1904–1914)
No 6 2nd Göta Artillery Regiment (1894–1905)
No 6 Småland Artillery Regiment (1905–1914)
No 7 Gotland Artillery Corps (1892–1914)
No 8 Vaxholm Artillery Corps (1892–1901)
No 8 Boden-Karlsborg Artillery Regiment (1902–1914)
No 9 Karlsborg Artillery Corps (1893–1902)
No 9 Positionsartilleriregementet (1902–1914)

By name 
2nd Göta Artillery Regiment
2nd Svea Artillery Regiment
Artillery Regiment, old
Artillery Regiment, new
Bergslagen Artillery Regiment
Boden-Karlsborg Artillery Regiment
Boden Artillery Battalion
Boden Artillery Regiment
Former Finnish Artillery Regiment
Finnish Artillery Regiment
Field Artillery Regiment
1st Göta Artillery Regiment
1st Svea Artillery Regiment
Gotland Artillery Corps
Gotland Artillery Regiment
Göta Artillery Regiment
Karlsborg Artillery Battalion
Karlsborg Artillery Corps
Norrbotten Artillery Corps
Norrland Artillery Battalion
Norrland Artillery Regiment
Positionsartilleriregementet
Småland Army Artillery Regiment
Småland Artillery Regiment
Svea Artillery Regiment
Uppland Artillery Regiment
Vaxholm Artillery Corps
Wendes Artillery Regiment

By designation 
A 1
A 2
A 3
A 4
A 5
A 6
A 7
A 8
A 8 B
A 8 K
A 9
A 10
A 11
Artbat/I 19
Artreg

See also 
List of Swedish regiments

References 
Print

Online

 
artillery